Return of the Killer A's is a compilation / best of album by American heavy metal band Anthrax, released in 1999.

The cover of "Ball of Confusion" features Anthrax's first new recording with former lead singer Joey Belladonna since 1991, and their first with former bassist Dan Lilker since 1984. Neither one would stay with the band past that song's recording, though a tour featuring both Belladonna and then-current Anthrax singer John Bush was in the works at one point. The song is also notable because it features both Belladonna and Bush on vocals.

Track listing

The album included at least one song from all but their debut studio album, Fistful of Metal, up to the point of the disc's release in 1999. Also included is the track taken from two EPs and "Bring the Noise", a Public Enemy remix featuring Anthrax previously released on Attack of the Killer B's, the compilation of B-sides.

Two singles were released from Return of the Killer A's: 
"Crush" was released as a single off the album, appearing only with the song itself, on which it says "From the Beyond Music release Return of the Killer A's - The Best of Anthrax.
"Ball of Confusion" was released as a single also, having the album version of the song, along with the edit.

Personnel
John Bush – lead vocals
Dan Spitz – lead guitar
Scott Ian – rhythm guitar, backing vocals
Frank Bello – bass guitar, backing vocals
Charlie Benante – drums
Joey Belladonna - lead vocals
Paul Crook - lead guitar

References

Albums produced by Eddie Kramer
Albums produced by Dave Jerden
Albums produced by Mark Dodson
Anthrax (American band) compilation albums
1999 compilation albums